Turki bin Muhammad Al Saud (born 5 October 1979) is a Saudi Minister of State, a Member of The Council of Ministers of Saudi Arabia, and a Member of the House of Saud.

Early life and education
Prince Turki was born on 7 October 1979 in Riyadh. His father, Prince Mohammed bin Fahd, is the former governor of the Eastern Province. He is the grandson of King Fahd who was the older brother of King Salman bin Abdulaziz. Prince Turki was raised by his grandfathers, King Fahd, and Prince Nayef bin Abdulaziz.

Prince Turki received his primary, intermediate, and secondary education at the Dhahran School, an international K-9 institution owned and operated by the Saudi Aramco School District. He graduated from King Faisal University in 2002 earning a bachelor's degree in law.

Community service
Prince Turki is involved in his community in various ways: he is the vice-chairman of the Board of Trustees of Prince Mohammad University. Prince Turki chairs the executive committee of the Prince Mohammed bin Fahd Foundation for Humanitarian Development.

The Prince is the president of the Founding Committee of the Prince Sultan bin Abdulaziz College for the Visually Impaired, an initiative that fosters learning opportunities for people with this kind of disability. He is also the founder of an organization that provides opportunities for orphans.

Businesses
Prince Turki is chairman of the TAALEM Educational Services Company. He also serves as Vice Chairman of the Saudi Arabian Amiantit Company, which was founded in 1968 and is headquartered in Dammam. Together with its subsidiaries, the company has developed into a major diversified industrial group and manufactures and sells pipes and related products worldwide. The Group comprises 30 pipe system manufacturing plants, 6 technology companies, 4 materials suppliers, and 8 supply and engineering subsidiaries in a number of countries around the world. In addition, an extensive sales and service network caters to the needs of customers in more than 70 countries.

References

External links
Official website of Turki bin Mohammed bin Fahd Al Saud

Turki

Turki
1979 births
Turki
Living people
Turki